Dominique Girard (c.1680 – 1738) was a seventeenth-century French garden designer and water engineer.

He was a pupil of André Le Nôtre.

References

1680s births
1738 deaths
French landscape architects
Architects of the Bavarian court
French gardeners